ANKA (abbreviation for „Angströmquelle Karlsruhe“) is a synchrotron light source facility at the Karlsruhe Institute of Technology (KIT). The KIT runs ANKA as a national synchrotron light source and as a large scale user facility for the international science community. Being a large scale machine of the performance category LK II of the Helmholtz Association (Helmholtz Association of German Research Centres), ANKA is part of a national and European infrastructure offering research services to scientific and commercial users for their purposes in research and development. The facility was opened to external users in 2003.

History
In 1997, the decision was formed to realize the project of building the large scale facility ANKA on the premises of the former Research Center Karlsruhe. By the end of 1998, the outer structure of ANKA was erected, and already in 1999, the first electrons were inducted into the storage ring. After a few more years of machine and laboratory development, in March 2003 ANKA opened its doors for users from the science community and industry, initially featuring seven beamlines: six analytical beamlines and one for the generation of microstructures using X-ray lithography. 
Since then further improvements and extensions were continuously developed and implemented: Currently 15 beamlines are in operation, three more are in the process of installation. The machine itself saw the implementation of several updated generations of its insertion devices (undulators and wigglers) that were in part developed at ANKA. Moreover, a fully developed infrastructure supports users at ANKA, as for example fully equipped user apartments on the premises of the KIT Campus North can be booked by external ANKA users.

Organisational structure
Since an institutional reorganization in 2012, the synchrotron research at the KIT has been divided into three separate but closely related units: 
-	The large scale synchrotron facility ANKA with its attached beamlines has now the status of an independent unit that is directly subordinate to the directory board of the KIT. The technical development of the facility as well as the in-house research by the beamline scientists are conducted by the board of ANKA. The support and accommodation of external users is provided by the user office of ANKA. 
-	The former Institute for Synchrotron radiation (ISS) which was initially responsible for the development and maintenance of ANKA has now been transformed into the Institute for Photon Science and Synchrotron radiation. Albeit still conducting intensive research at ANKA, IPS is now institutionally separated from the synchrotron facility. 
-	The independent service unit ANKA Commercial Services (ANKA-CoS) supports customers from research and industry in the preparation and conduction of their research projects in fields such as development, quality management and micro fabrication.

Technical Details
ANKA features a storage ring with a circumference of 110.4 m (120.7 yards) that stores electrons at the energy of 2.5 GeV. For this purpose, electrons (90 keV) are generated by a triode and preaccelerated to 500 MeV via a “Racetrack Microtron” (53 MeV) and a booster. The actual working energy is finally reached in the storage ring, where the electrons are now spinning at almost the speed of light. The storage ring contains an ultra-high vacuum of 10−9 mbar. The synchrotron light is thereby generated by the constant deflection of 16 magnets that keep the electrons focused in the center of the tube. In addition to that, wigglers and undulators – specialized magnet configurations with alternating straight and reverse polarity – are used to deflect the electrons into a sinus-curve-like course on which they emit synchrotron radiation. 
A special feature of the ANKA synchrotron configuration is the super conducting SCU15 undulator that was – as its predecessor SCU14 – co-developed at the ANKA facility. This new undulator does not only generate synchrotron light of enhanced brilliance, but also a much more variable spectrum of radiation easily adjustable to the respective research requirements.

ANKA beamlines and their applications

Imaging methods
IMAGE Use of X-rays for imaging procedures in 2D- and 3D-fields, static as well as dynamic – in the state of installation
MPI-MF Conducted by the Max-Planck-Institute for Intelligent Systems, Specialized on in situ analyses of interfaces and thin films
NANO High definition in-situ X-ray diffraction – in the final phase of installation
PDIFF Analysis using the Debye-Scherrer-Powder diffraction (examination and identification of crystalline substances in powdered samples
SCD Analysis of X-ray diffraction on single crystals
TOPO-TOMO Topography, microradiology and microtomography using polychromatic light and X-rays

Spectroscopy
FLUO X-ray fluorescence spectroscopy, non-destructive qualitative and quantitative identification of the elemental composition of a sample
INE Installed and conducted by the KIT Institute for Nuclear Waste Disposal for the sake of actinide-research
IR1 Infrared spectroscopy and infrared ellipsometry including terahertz radiation
IR2 Infrared spectroscopy and infrared microscopy including terahertz radiation
SUL-X Absorption, fluorescence- and diffraction analysis as part of the synchrotron environmental laboratory
UV-CD12 Conducted by the KIT Institute for Biological Interfaces, UV-circular dichroism-spectroscopy (structural analysis of biological substances)
WERA Soft X-ray analysis conducted by the KIT Institute for Solid-State Physics
XAS X-ray absorption spectroscopy, XANES (chemical composition of a sample) and EXAFS (Number, distance and type of neighboring atom (also in non-crystalline form)

Microfabrication
LIGA I, II, III Deep X-ray lithography according to the LIGA-procedure developed at the KIT. The three beamlines differ regarding the level of available energy

Advantages of synchrotron light sources
In comparison to conventional radiation sources, synchrotrons produce light in a far broader spectrum and a much higher intensity. The generated radiation consists of a very broad continuous electromagnetic spectrum covering the full range from hard X-rays to wavelengths beyond the infrared scope (Terahertz radiation). Monochromators then allow the filtering of the required scope of wavelengths. Since the electrons are stored in packages inside the storage ring, synchrotron radiation occurs in pulses. Thus, dynamic processes up to the scope of nano seconds can be resolved and measured. Already from its generation on the radiation is polarized (linearly or circularly); a prerequisite for many experimental applications.

Access for scientific users
Besides the scientists at ANKA and IPS that contribute to the development of the synchrotron and its components, external users in particular have the opportunity to use the radiation generated at ANKA for their own research projects. Users of the international science community are coordinated by ANKA's user office. Twice a year, proposals for beamtime at ANKA are collected via an online application procedure. The actual beamtime is then allocated by an international scientific committee that evaluates the submitted proposals. On the premises of KIT Campus North a guest house grants the accommodation of external users for the time of their project at ANKA. More information on the allocation of beamtime can be found on the web pages of the user office.

Access for commercial users
ANKA Commercial Services (ANKA-CoS) offers full service support (certified according to DIN EN ISO 9001:2008) to commercial customers during their project at ANKA as well as regarding subsequent matters such as licensing or industrial application of technologies developed at ANKA. Access to beamtime is allocated on short notice without peer-time revision via consultation with the responsible beamline scientist. Unlike the findings of scientific users who have to present and provide their results to the science community, the research of commercial users remains confidential at any time

External links
 Official Website
 User office
 Website ANKA Commercial Services

Synchrotron radiation facilities